The Oceania Continent Handball Federation (OCHF) is the governing body for the Olympic sport of Handball in Oceania. It was founded in 2014 and is affiliated to the International Handball Federation (IHF) and Asian Handball Federation (AHF).

The OCHF is administered by an executive committee elected annually by its members. The OCHF members are the local governing Handball federations in countries within the Oceania region that are also members of the
IHF and AHF.

History
The first Oceania Handball Federation (OHF) was founded on 9 July 1993, by Mr. Alexander Dimitric in Sydney, Australia. In 2009, the Oceania Handball Federation was disbanded.

OCHF Presidents

OCHF Members
Full Members

  American Samoa
  Australia
  Cook Islands
  Federated States of Micronesia
  Fiji
  Guam
  Kiribati
  Marshall Islands
  Nauru ✝
  New Zealand
  Palau ✝
  Papua New Guinea
  Samoa
  Solomon Islands
  Tonga
  Tuvalu ✝
  Vanuatu

✝ means non-active member

Associated Members
  New Caledonia
  Northern Mariana Islands
  Tahiti

Tournaments

Nations
Indoor
 Oceania Men's Handball Nations Cup
 Oceania Women's Handball Nations Cup
 Oceania Handball Challenge Trophy - Under 21s
 Oceania Youth Handball Championship - Under 19s
 Pacific Handball Cup
 French Pacific Handball Championship
Beach
 Oceania Beach Handball Championship
 Oceania Junior Beach Handball Championship - Under 19's
 Oceania Youth Beach Handball Championship - Under 17's

Clubs
 Oceania Handball Champions Cup
 Oceania Women's Handball Champions Cup

References

Sports organizations established in 2011
+Oceania
Handball in Oceania
National members of the International Handball Federation
Handball